Qseven, a computer-on-module (COM) form factor, is a small, highly integrated computer module that can be used in a design application much like an integrated circuit component.  It is smaller than other computer-on-module standards such as COM Express, ETX or XTX and is limited to very low power consuming CPUs.  The maximum power consumption should be no more than 12 watts.

Specification
The name comes from the word "quadratic" due to the square shape of the original module, 70mm on a side. It was first proposed in 2008 by Congatec.
Other companies based in Europe such as Kontron adopted the standard, but after a few years it had not yet been popular in the USA.
The Qseven specification is hosted by the Standardization Group for Embedded Technologies (SGET), which took over from the original Qseven consortium in 2013..
The revision 2.0 was released September 9, 2012, and 2.1 on February 25, 2016.

The Qseven design guide provides information for designing a custom system carrier board for Qseven modules.  It includes reference schematics for the external circuitry required to implement various peripheral functions.  It also explains how to extend the supported buses and how to add additional peripherals and expansion slots to a Qseven-based system.
It's available from the Qseven consortium webpage.

Since the release of Specification 1.20 (September 10, 2010) Qseven modules can be based on x86 or ARM architectures.

Interfaces
The Qseven specification defines a rich set of legacy-free interfaces.  Older interfaces like PCI, ISA, RS-232 or EIDE are not supported.
 4× PCI Express ×1 Lanes
 2× SATA
 8× USB 2.0
 1× 1000BaseT Ethernet
 1× SDIO 4-bit
 Low-voltage differential signaling (LVDS) 2× 24-bit
 SDVO / HDMI / DisplayPort (shared)
 HDA (High Definition Audio)
 I²C Bus
 Low Pin Count bus
 CAN bus (Controller–area network)
 Serial Peripheral Interface (SPI) bus

Sizes
 70 mm × 70 mm;
 70 mm × 40 mm.

Connector
Qseven uses one 230 pin MXM2 SMT edge connector to connect all power and signal lanes to the carrier board.  This connector is available from multiple vendors at different heights (5.5 mm and 7.8 mm).

See also
 ETX
 XTX
 COM Express
 Smart Mobility Architecture (SMARC) another specification from the same group

References

External links
 RTC Magazine: Atom-Based Qseven Module Addresses the Portable Device Market

Computer hardware standards
Motherboard form factors